Pseudagrion kersteni, powder-striped sprite, Kersten's sprite or the powder-striped sprite, is a species of damselfly in the family Coenagrionidae. It is found in Angola, Benin, Burkina Faso, Cameroon, Central African Republic, Chad, the Republic of the Congo, Ivory Coast, Equatorial Guinea, Ethiopia, Ghana, Guinea, Kenya, Malawi, Mali, Mozambique, Namibia, Nigeria, Somalia, South Africa, Sudan, Tanzania, Togo, Uganda, Zambia, Zimbabwe, and possibly Burundi. Its natural habitat is rivers.

References

External links

 Pseudagrion kersteni on African Dragonflies and Damselflies Online
 Illustration (watercolour) by Sélys

Coenagrionidae
Insects described in 1869
Taxonomy articles created by Polbot